Komagfjord is a village in Alta Municipality in Troms og Finnmark county, Norway.  The village is located along the Altafjorden on a fairly isolated peninsula in the northeastern part of the municipality.  There is one ferry connection to the rest of Norway, but no road connections.  The village looks across the fjord at the large island of Seiland.  The village is home to Komagfjord Church.

References

Villages in Finnmark
Alta, Norway
Populated places of Arctic Norway